Diana Sandra Meriva Bilelo (born 3 March 2002) is an Equatorial Guinean footballer who plays as a midfielder for Portuguese club Bragalona FC and the Equatorial Guinea women's national team.

Club career
Meriva has played for Atlético Malabo and Inter Malabo in Equatorial Guinea.

International career
Meriva capped for Equatorial Guinea at senior level during the 2018 Africa Women Cup of Nations, playing in one match. She also represented the country at under-20 level at the 2019 African Games.

References

External links

2002 births
Living people
Equatoguinean women's footballers
Women's association football midfielders
Equatorial Guinea women's international footballers
African Games competitors for Equatorial Guinea
Competitors at the 2019 African Games
Bubi people
Equatoguinean expatriate women's footballers
Equatoguinean expatriate sportspeople in Portugal
Expatriate women's footballers in Portugal